Luxembourg was represented by French singer France Gall, with the song "Poupée de cire, poupée de son", at the 1965 Eurovision Song Contest, which took place on 20 March in Naples. The song, composed by Serge Gainsbourg, was chosen internally by broadcaster RTL and went on to bring Luxembourg their second Eurovision victory.

"Poupée de cire, poupée de son" is considered one of the most significant and influential songs in Eurovision history, as its victory proved that a thoroughly up-to-the-minute song performed by a trendy young artist could be just as successful as the more traditional style of song and performer which had previously dominated the contest. Its success is said to have finally dragged Eurovision into the 1960s and changed the direction of the whole event. Its influence was apparent immediately, as the 1966 contest saw many more countries sending entries in a contemporary pop style than had ever been the case before. The only slight controversy following the win was a degree of reproach from the French media and public towards Gainsbourg and Gall for having submitted this song to represent Luxembourg rather than France.

At Eurovision 
On the night of the final Gall performed 15th in the running order, following Denmark and preceding Finland. Gall's pert and gamine performance has since become one of the most famous and widely-shown in Eurovision history. In the voting "Poupée de cire, poupée de son" led from start to finish, gaining 32 points and winning by a 6-point margin over another very contemporary song by the United Kingdom's Kathy Kirby. The Luxembourgian jury awarded its 5 points to Denmark, who had arguably the most old-fashioned song of the night.

Voting

Congratulations: 50 Years of the Eurovision Song Contest

"Poupee de cire, poupée de son" was one of the fourteen Eurovision songs chosen by fans to compete in the Congratulations 50th anniversary special in 2005. Gall did not appear at the event, nor did Luxembourg (who withdrew from competing in Eurovision after 1993) broadcast it. The song appeared ninth in the running order, following "Fly on the Wings of Love" by the Olsen Brothers and preceding "Everyway That I Can" by Sertab Erener. Like the other songs on the evening, it was represented by dancers performing alongside video footage of Gall's original performance. At the end of the first round, "Poupee de cire, poupee de son" was not announced as one of the five songs proceeding to the second round. It was later revealed that the song finished fourteenth and last, scoring 37 points (five more than her winning score in 1965).

Voting

References 

1965
Countries in the Eurovision Song Contest 1965
Eurovision